Hallomenus axillaris is a species of fungus beetle in the family Tetratomidae. It was described by German entomologist Johann Karl Wilhelm Illiger in 1807. It is found in Europe. In the Moscow region, it has been recorded growing in the fruitbodies of the fungi Hapalopilus rutilans, Laetiporus sulphureus, Polyporus squamosus, Postia fragilis, Pycnoporellus fulgens, Tyromyces chioneus, and Fomes fomentarius.

References

Beetles described in 1807
Tenebrionoidea